Tamaria stria is a species of sea star.  It is a member of the Ophidiasteridae Family of Ophidiasterid Sea Stars. The Tamaria Genus has 21 individuals worldwide. However, only this species is found in the Pacific Ocean's Mexico waters. The cylindrical arms of tamarisk sea stars are decorated with rows of apertures through which gill papillae emerge. Their aboral surface has a granulate texture. Depending on the food, they can vary in color from consistent maroon, purple, or red. The largest wingspan of a tamarisk sea star is 17.5 cm (6.8 inches).

Environment

 Tamaria stria live in marine habitats. Aquatic habitats with high quantities of dissolved salt make up marine ecosystems. They comprise the deep ocean, the open ocean, and the coastal marine ecosystems, each of which has unique biological and physical properties. Between 12 m (40 ft) and 50 m of water, rocky and debris habitats are where you may find the Tamarisk Sea Star (165 feet).  The Tamarisk Sea Star is a resident of Mexican waters in the Pacific Ocean; nevertheless, they have a restricted range, only occurring between the Midriff Islands in the Sea of Cortez and Guatemala.

Food & Reproduction

 Tamaria stria are carnivores. Consume tiny invertebrates, algae, and echinoderms for food. Exhibit both sexual (gonochoric) and asexual (regeneration and clonal) reproduction methods. Life cycle: Embryos develop into planktonic larvae, then change into pentamerous juveniles, which eventually grow into young sea stars with stubby arms.

Morphology & Anatomy

 Little disc with five long, blunt, cylindrical arms. Diamond-shaped carinal, adradial, superomarginal, and inferomarginal plates slightly overhang the previous plate's distal corner link transversely to the adjacent row of scales. Six rows of papular regions, each with 6–10 pores. Actinic intermediate plates are arranged in three rows, splitting into two farther out. Up to the adambulacral armature, the granules covering the whole body are close-packed and uniform in shape, with papular sections having somewhat smaller granules than plates. Two spines in the adambulacral furrow, one minor and acicular and the other heavy and wide on the furrow's plane. Single, hefty, thick, and longer than wide sub-ambulacral spines. Pedicellariae wasn't found. The madreporite is round and covered in small, radiating gyri. Anus is subcentral and unnoticeable. The ocular plates are large, spherical, elevated, essentially naked, and with few granules. Reddish orange is the color when it is alive; dried orange is vivid with blue papular patches.

Original description 

 Downey, M.E. (1975). Asteroidea from Malpelo Island with a description of a new species of the genus      Tamaria. Smithsonian Contributions to Zoology 176: 86-90 page(s): 87
 Mah, C.L. (2023). World Asteroidea Database. Tamaria stria Downey, 1975. Accessed through: World Register of Marine Species at: https://www.marinespecies.org/aphia.php?p=taxdetails&id=368998 on 2023-03-19

References 

 Parducho, V. A. (2015, June 22). Reproduction of Tamaria megaloplax. Reproduction summary - tamaria megaloplax. Retrieved March 20, 2023, from https://www.sealifebase.ca/Reproduction/FishReproSummary.php?ID=138777&GenusName=Tamaria&SpeciesName=megaloplax&fc=1630&StockCode=84714
 Downey, M. E. (1971, July 30). TWO NEW SPECIES OF THE GENUS TAMARIA (ECHINODERMATA: ASTEROIDEA) FROM THE TROPICAL WESTERN ATLANTIC. Retrieved March 20, 2023, from http://rediberoamericanaequinodermos.com/wp-content/uploads/2016/02/Proceedings-on-the-Biological-No.-5.pdf 
 Downey, M. E. (1975, May). The Biological Investigation of Malpelo Island, Colombia. Asteroidea from Malpelo Island with a Description of a New Species of the Genus Tamaria. Retrieved March 20, 2023, from https://repository.si.edu/bitstream/handle/10088/5254/SCtZ-0176-Lo_res.pdf 
 Myers, P. (2018, January 25). Valvatida - majority of commonly seen sea stars. The Great Barrier Reef Library. Retrieved March 20, 2023, from http://thegreatbarrierreeflibrary.org/valvatida-commonly-seen-sea-stars/ 
 NASA. (2006, March 25). File:WPDMS NASA Topo Gulf of california.jpg - wikimedia commons. Retrieved March 20, 2023, from https://commons.wikimedia.org/wiki/File:Wpdms_nasa_topo_gulf_of_california.jpg 
 National Geographic Society. (2022, May 20). Marine Ecosystems. Education. Retrieved March 20, 2023, from https://education.nationalgeographic.org/resource/marine-ecosystems/ 
 Projects, C. to W. (2023, March 5). Wikimedia Commons. Retrieved March 20, 2023, from https://commons.wikimedia.org/wiki/Main_Page 
 Projects, C. to W. (2023, March 5). Wikimedia Commons. Retrieved March 20, 2023, from https://commons.wikimedia.org/wiki/Main_Page 
 Snow, J. (2020, May 10). Tamarisk Sea Star. Mexican Fish. Retrieved March 20, 2023, from https://mexican-fish.com/tamarisk-sea-star/ 
 Tamaria stria Downey, 1975 in GBIF Secretariat (2022). GBIF Backbone Taxonomy. Checklist dataset https://doi.org/10.15468/39omei accessed via GBIF.org on 2023-03-20.
 University of Hawaii. (2021). Exploring our Fluid Earth. Phylum Echinodermata . Retrieved March 20, 2023, from https://manoa.hawaii.edu/exploringourfluidearth/biological/invertebrates/phylum-echinodermata 
 WoRMS. (2008, October 24). World register of marine species - tamaria stria downey, 1975. Retrieved March 20, 2023, from https://www.marinespecies.org/aphia.php?p=taxdetails&id=368998

Ophidiasteridae
Fauna of the Pacific Ocean